Ryan Killeen (born July 11, 1983) is an American football placekicker for the National Football League Seattle Seahawks' NFL Europe affiliate Amsterdam Admirals.

Professional career
He was originally signed as a free agent for the Detroit Lions, but was cut before the regular season.

College career
Killeen played college football at the University of Southern California. He transferred there from Mt. San Antonio College in his sophomore season.

External links
TSN Bio

1983 births
Living people
USC Trojans football players
Amsterdam Admirals players
American football placekickers
Sportspeople from California